Mantex (BVC: MTX) is a Venezuela-based company active in the real estate industry. The company engages in the construction, commercialization and management of real estate properties. It also purchases, sells, and manages immovable movable goods and securities; develops, prepares, commercializes and distributes advertising means; builds and leases real estate properties; operates and manages private areas for transit and parking lots; and carries out general investments.

References 
https://www.bloomberg.com/research/stocks/private/snapshot.asp?privcapId=877981

Real estate companies of Venezuela
Companies listed on the Caracas Stock Exchange